Blaškovec is a village in Croatia. It is connected to Rijeka and Zagreb by the D3 highway. It is the birthplace of Ivan Nepomuk Labaš, who translated the Bible into Kajkavian.

References

Populated places in Zagreb County